Voller or Vollers may refer to:
Voller Brothers, violin makers
Vollers Corset Company, a corset manufacturer

People with the surname
Karl Vollers, German orientalist
Kurt Vollers, American former football offensive lineman
Marja-Liisa Völlers, German politician
Maryanne Vollers, author and journalist
Marco Völler, (born 1989), German basketball player
Rudi Völler, (born 1960), German football player and manager